Asian Games Village may refer to:
Asian Games Village (Beijing)
Asian Games Village (New Delhi)